The Changyŏn Line is a non-electrified standard-gauge secondary line of the Korean State Railway running from Sugyo on the Ŭnnyul Line to Changyŏn, South Hwanghae Province, North Korea.

History 

This line was originally opened on 21 January 1937 as part of the Chosen Railway's  narrow gauge Hwanghae Line network, as an extension to the Sariwŏn—Sanghae (renamed Samgang after nationalisation)—Sugyo line. The entirety of the Hwanghae Line network was nationalised on 1 April 1944 and absorbed by the Chosen Government Railway, which then split the Hwanghae Line network into separate lines, with the Sariwon—Sugyo—Changyŏn line becoming the Changyŏn Line.

After the end of the Pacific War, the Changyŏn Line ended up in North Korea as a result of the subsequent partition of Korea. After the end of the Korean War the Railway Ministry of the DPRK began to expand and improve its network, including in South Hwanghae, leading to the opening of a line from Sugyo to Ch'ŏlgwang in 1961. With the opening of the new line, the Sariwŏn—Sugyo—Ch'ŏlgwang line was named Ŭnnyul Line, leaving the Changyŏn Line as just the short branch from Sugyo to Changyŏn. This line was converted to standard gauge in 1971.

Services 

Semi-express passenger trains 138-139/140-141 operating between Manp'o and Changyŏn serve the entirety of this line from Sugyo to Changyŏn.

Route 
A yellow background in the "Distance" box indicates that section of the line is not electrified.

References

 

Railway lines in North Korea
Standard gauge railways in North Korea